Corniculate, an Anglicisation of the Latin diminutives corniculata, corniculatum, and corniculatus, describes an object possessing hornlike extensions.  The root is Latin cornu = "horn".  The term is used to describe the shape of the corniculate cartilages of the larynx.  The horned puffin (Fratercula corniculata) is named for its distinctive horn-like coloration.  Likewise Oxalis corniculata (creeping woodsorrel) is named for its two erect capsules, which resemble little horns, and the bird's-foot trefoil Lotus corniculatus and goat's horn mangrove Aegiceras corniculatum are named for their horn-shaped fruits.

References 

Animal anatomy